General of Infantry Karl August Adolf von Krafft (9 November 1764, in Delitz am Berge – 18 April 1840, in Königsberg) was a Prussian officer who fought in the Napoleonic Wars.

Notes

References

1764 births
1840 deaths
Prussian commanders of the Napoleonic Wars
Generals of Infantry (Prussia)
Military personnel from Saxony-Anhalt
People from Saalekreis